Ko Adang is the second biggest island within Tarutao National Marine Park, in Thailand, very close to Ko Lipe island. The island is 6 km long and 5 km wide. The highest point on the island is 690 m.

Overview 
Adang is surrounded by only few sandy beaches, but the offshore coral reef is abundant. The hilly interior is covered in dense jungle. There are two waterfalls on Ko Adang.

Tourism 
There are some mountain trails suitable for hiking through the jungle forest. View points along the way offer views over the nearby island of Ko Lipe and the sea panorama behind.

The island is very quiet and undeveloped, thanks to being part of Tarutao National Park. On the southern tip (closest to Ko Lipe) there are camping facilities, as well as bungalows, all belonging to the national park. There is also a ranger station. Long-tail boats can be hired to get to other sights on and around Ko Adang, including a black sand beach to the north of the island.

References

External links

Ko Tarutao National Park, Department of National Parks

Ko Adang
Islands of the Strait of Malacca